Perevalsk is a city in the southwestern part of the Luhansk Oblast (province) of Ukraine, Donbas. It is the administrative center of Perevalsk Raion. Population: , .

Perevalsk borders immediately on the larger town of Alchevsk which in 1961–1991 also was named after the Paris Commune as Kommunarsk.

Since 2014, Perevalsk has been administered as a part of the self-proclaimed Luhansk People's Republic. 

Following the 2022 annexation referendums in Russian-occupied Ukraine, Russia has declared the territory as their own, as part of their LPR (LNR).

History 

Perevalsk was founded in 1889 as Seleznyovsky Quarry, for the workers in coal mining and it belonged to Podolian nobleman and Imperial Russian loyal subject Kazimierz Mscichowski. Over time it grew by incorporating similar miner's settlements. In 1924 it was renamed as imeni Parizhskoi Kommuny (after the Paris Commune) out of brevity was referred to as Parkommuna. In 1938 it adopted its shortened name, Parkommuna, as official, and in 1964 it acquired its present name. In 1964, it became the administrative center of the newly established Perevalsk Raion.

References

Cities in Luhansk Oblast
Perevalsk Raion
Cities of district significance in Ukraine
Populated places established in the Russian Empire